Bandar Springhill is a planned township in Port Dickson District, Negeri Sembilan, Malaysia. A suburb of Port Dickson, the township is located near Lukut, and also adjacent to Bandar Sri Sendayan in neighbouring Seremban District. Bandar Springhill is accessible from both Seremban and Port Dickson via Malaysia Federal Route 53 and Seremban-Port Dickson Highway .

Development

West Synergy Sdn Bhd, a 60-40 joint-venture between MUI Properties Berhad and Chin Teck Plantations Berhad planned out to develop the  freehold land into the following components:
Springhill Park
Springhill Gardens
Springhill Commercial Centre
E3A (Amarilis)
E4 (Olive & Maple)
E5 (Nebula)
E6 (Aurora & Nova)
E7-1 (Peony & Freesia)
E7-2 (Irises & Cosmos)
E8 (Cempaka)
E9 (Junction Shop Lot)
E10
E11 (Springhill Heights)
Springhill Industrial Park

About
First launched in July 1997
2000 acre freehold integrated township situated between Seremban and Port Dickson
Good accessibility via the North-South Expressway (E2), Seremban-Port Dickson Highway (E29) and  the Seremban-Port Dickson trunk road.
Well-balanced mix of residential, commercial, industrial and recreational developments
Supported by modern communal facilities such as polyclinics, medical healthcare center, kindergartens, schools, higher educational centers, recreational centers and shopping centers.

External links

Website : www.bandarspringhill.com
Facebook : www.facebook.com/bandarspringhillseremban
Instagram : www.instagram.com/bandarspringhill

Populated places in Negeri Sembilan
Port Dickson District